Waimarino is the original name of the town National Park, New Zealand. It was renamed to avoid confusion, as increasingly the wider area was referred to by the same name. Waimarino may refer to the following:

 Waimarino district, an area at the foot of Mount Ruapehu
 Waimarino (New Zealand electorate), an electorate centred on Waimarino
 Waimarino County, a former territorial local authority
 Waimarino Museum, a museum in Raetihi
 Waimarino River, a river in the region